Tulipa bifloriformis is a species of tulip native to Central Asia. Its dwarfed 'Starlight' cultivar has gained the Royal Horticultural Society's Award of Garden Merit.

Physical description 
Tulipa bifloriformis comes in two different forms, a regular flower and a dwarf variant. The regular flower grows between 15-20 cm (5,9- 7.87in) and the dwarf form is 5-7cm (1.9- 2.7in). The flower has a yellow base and a white satellite.

Geography 
Tulips originate from Central Asia (Uzbekistan, Turkmenistan, Kazakhstan region). Tulipa bifloriformis grows in stony or clay slops.

History 
The tulip is native to Central Asia but is naturalized throughout Europe thanks to trading on the Silk Road.

References

bifloriformis
Plants described in 1971